Emeline Pierre (born 4 December 1999) is a French Paralympic swimmer who competes at international swimming competitions. She is a World bronze medalist and a double European bronze medalist.

In 2014, Pierre fell badly from a balance beam at a gymnastics competition and dislocated her right elbow. She had several operations to regain movement on her right arm but it was unsuccessful and it caused permanent damage to her arm.

References

External links
 
 

1999 births
Living people
Sportspeople from Pau, Pyrénées-Atlantiques
Paralympic swimmers of France
French female freestyle swimmers
French female backstroke swimmers
French female medley swimmers
Swimmers at the 2020 Summer Paralympics
Medalists at the World Para Swimming Championships
Medalists at the World Para Swimming European Championships
20th-century French women
21st-century French women